Frera is a historic brand of motorcycles, which were produced in Tradate. Until the late 1920s Frera was one of the leading Italian motor brands. The factory finally closed in 1936. In Tradate there is today a museum dedicated to this brand.

See also 

List of Italian companies
List of motorcycle manufacturers

External links 

Cycle manufacturers of Italy
Defunct motor vehicle manufacturers of Italy
Vehicle manufacturing companies established in 1905
Italian companies established in 1905
Vehicle manufacturing companies disestablished in 1934
1934 disestablishments in Italy
Defunct motorcycle manufacturers of Italy